Primo Gaida (born 20 September 1899, date of death unknown) was a Swiss racing cyclist. He rode in the 1926 Tour de France.

References

1899 births
Year of death missing
Swiss male cyclists